Green Rock is a neighborhood of the city of Colona in Henry County, Illinois, United States. Once a separate community, Green Rock was named so because it is the place where the Green River meets up with the Rock River.

References
 

Populated places in Henry County, Illinois
Neighborhoods in Illinois